Bush violet or bush-violet is a common name for several plants and may refer to:

Barleria obtusa, a species in the family Acanthaceae native to South Africa
Browallia, a genus in the family Solanaceae native to the Americas